Hisham Al Asheeri is a Bahraini politician, academic, and author. He was sworn in on December 12, 2018 as a member of the Council of Representatives for the sixth district of Muharraq Governorate.

Career
Al Asheeri worked earlier at the Bahraini branch of the Arab Open University, first as Director of Continuing Education and Professional Development, then as Assistant Director of Academic Affairs for the entire Bahrain office.

He has written several books, most notably the following:
 المهارات الكتابية والتعلم الذاتي (“Writing Skills and Self-Learning,” 2003)
 تكنولوجيا الوسائط المتعددة التعليمية في القرن الحادي والعشرين (“Educational Multimedia Technology in the Twenty-first Century,” 2011)

Election
Al Asheeri ran for the sixth district in the Muharraq Governorate in the 2018 Bahraini general election. He won in the first round on November 24 of that year, with 1,556 votes for 59.12%.

References

Academic staff of Arab Open University
Bahraini writers
Bahraini Shia Muslims
Members of the Council of Representatives (Bahrain)
Living people
Year of birth missing (living people)